Kokkarayanpet is a village in Namakkal district of Tamil Nadu, India. According to the 2001 census it had a population of 5628.

References

Cities and towns in Namakkal district